Zemer is an Israeli Arab town. It may also refer to:

Hanna Zemer, or Hannah Semer (1925–2003), Israeli journalist
Moshe Zemer (1932-2011), Israeli Reform Rabbi
"Zemër" (song), a song by Kosovo-Albanian singer Dhurata Dora and French-Algerian rapper Soolking
"Zemer" (Tiri song), song by Albanian singer Tahir Gjoci known by the mononym Tiri 
Zemer (Jewish hymn), or z'mer, in Hebrew singular of Zemirot,  Jewish hymns, usually sung in the Hebrew or Aramaic languages, but sometimes also in Yiddish or Ladino